The 1992 European Promotion Cup for Men was the third edition of this tournament. It was hosted in Nicosia, Cyprus and Austria achieved its first title ever after beating Luxembourg in the final game.

Preliminary round

Group A

Group B

Classification games

Final round

Bracket

Final

Final ranking

External links
FIBA Archive

1992
1991–92 in European basketball
International basketball competitions hosted by Cyprus
1992 in Cypriot sport